Mārtiņš Trautmanis (born 7 July 1988 in Ventspils) is a Latvian cyclist.

Palmares
2007
1st  U23 National Time Trial Championships
2011
1st  National Road Race Championships

References

1988 births
Living people
Latvian male cyclists